The 2007 Capital One Bowl was held on January 1, 2007, at the Citrus Bowl in Orlando, Florida.  The game featured the Badgers of the University of Wisconsin–Madison, who finished the season tied for second in the Big Ten Conference, and the Razorbacks of the University of Arkansas, who finished the season first in the Southeastern Conference's West Division.

Overview
The Badgers used 206 yards and two touchdown passes from John Stocco to win 17–14 over Arkansas.

References

Capital One Bowl
Citrus Bowl (game)
Arkansas Razorbacks football bowl games
Wisconsin Badgers football bowl games
Capital One Bowl
Capital One Bowl